MNCH can refer to:

 Chinandega Airport, Chinandega, Nicaragua, ICAO code MNCH
 Mancher Chatta railway station, Mancher Chatta, Pakistan, station code MNCH
 National Maternal, Neonatal & Child Health Program, a devolved program of the Pakistani Ministry of National Health Services, Regulation and Coordination
 University of Oregon Museum of Natural and Cultural History, Eugene, Oregon, United States